Malcolm Bland is an association football player who represented New Zealand at international level.

Bland made his full All Whites debut in a 0–0 draw with over New Caledonia on 25 July 1969 and ended his international playing career with 16 A-international caps and 2 goals to his credit, his final cap a substitute appearance in a 0–1 loss to Indonesia on 18 March 1973.

References

External links

Living people
New Zealand association footballers
New Zealand international footballers
Association football midfielders
Year of birth missing (living people)
1973 Oceania Cup players